Miriam Jacqueline Snitzer (October 6, 1922 –  September 6, 1966), also known as Miriam Snitzer Clark, was an American actress.

Life
Miriam Snitzer was born in Cincinnati, Ohio on October 6, 1922 to Marie Donahue Snitzer and Louis A. Snitzer, a Hollywood agent who represented such clients as actor Buster Crabbe. She had two brothers, James G. Snitzer, who would become an actor and later die in combat during World War II, and Louis T. Snitzer.

During her youth the Snitzer family lived in Cincinnati. They eventually moved to Los Angeles and developed strong ties to the Hollywood film industry. The Snitzers resided on Benedict Canyon Road in Beverly Hills, California. Snitzer appeared in numerous films, including the 1947 production, Easy Come, Easy Go.

In December 1961 Snitzer married Joseph C. Clark, more than ten years her elder. Snitzer died on 6 September 1966 in California. She is buried at Holy Cross Cemetery, in Culver City, California. Just two months after her death, her father Louis died.

References 

American film actresses
Actresses from Beverly Hills, California
1922 births
1966 deaths
Burials at Holy Cross Cemetery, Culver City
20th-century American actresses
Actresses from Cincinnati